USS Gemini may refer to the following U.S. Navy ships:

 , a troop transport vessel originally commissioned on 4 August 1942 as USS Matinicus (AK-52)
 , the final ship of her class of hydrofoils operated by the U.S. Navy

United States Navy ship names